Itapevi is a Brazilian municipality in the state of São Paulo located in the western part of the Greater São Paulo metropolitan area (35 km to the west of São Paulo city). The population is 240,961 (2020 est.) in an area of 82.7 km2.

Its boundaries are Santana de Parnaíba to the north, Barueri in the northeast, Jandira in the east, Cotia to the south,  Vargem Grande Paulista to the southwest and São Roque to the west.

The city is served by Castello Branco and Raposo Tavares highways and also by Line 8 of CPTM, the São Paulo Metropolitan Railway Company.

Etymology

The toponym comes from the Tupi language Itapevi and means "river of flat stones," according to two books: "Vocabulário Tupi-Guarani - Português", by Prof. Silveira Bueno (Brasilivros Editora), and "A Origem dos Nomes dos Municípios Paulistas" (Imprensa Oficial do Estado de São Paulo, 2003), by Enio Squeff and Helder Perri Ferreira.

Says the constant entry of final work: "Itapevi (by Tupi - itá peb'y): itapevas river, the river slabs of flat stones, of ita-peba (flat stone slab) and 'y (river or waters) ".

History

The formation of the village began around the eighteenth century, and the first building in the city was a house built around 1720, used by bandeirantes. The earliest settlers probably are Abreus family.

On July 10, 1875, the train station of Cotia (Sorocabana) was inaugurated, around which formed the core of Itapevi. In 1895, the Italian Giulio Michaeli opened a quarry for the production of paving stones, attracting families of Italian immigrants, as Belli, Michelotti and Silicani.

In 1912, Joaquim Nunes Filho (Nho Quim), from Cotia city, purchased the Sítio Itapevy, with 152 bushels. This place covering all the current city center. Nunes became a local political boss, for his ties to the former PRP (Partido Republicano Paulista). He managed the elevation of the village to district Cotia on October 12, 1920; Nunes has brought electricity in 1929 and the installation of the first telephone in 1930.

Nevertheless, the reference of the place was still under the name of Cotia train station, removing the possibility of identifying own the place.

In 1940, arrived in Itapevi Carlos de Castro, businessman. Knowing that the Nunes family had pretensions to sell the land that belonged to Joaquim Nunes (who died in 1941), he acquired vast tract of land, giving rise to the allotment of Parque Suburbano and Jardim Bela Vista. It was from there that accelerated the process of urbanization of the place.

At the time, the train station was still called Cotia and the headquarters of the future city was known as Vila Cotia. With this, they created enormous confusion up to the postal and telegraph service in the district. In 1945, Carlos de Castro got with then Minister João Alberto that the station had its name changed to Itapevi. The people celebrated this decree.

On May 10, 1952, Carlos de Castro met with three other residents of the district: Nicolau Leonardo, Raul Leonardo and Ezequiel Dias Siqueira. Together they drafted a petition to the Assembléia Legislativa do Estado de São Paulo for the emancipation of the district. Taking more than a thousand signatures, but even so, they were defeated by the fact Itapevi be very near Cotia and that residents were indebted to the city. They had to wait five years for the project to be voted on again. From then and now in a spirit of emancipation throughout this region, members of the society of the time initiated the movement for autonomy in the district, causing the population to commit mass in the process. Its founders were men like himself Carlos de Castro, Americo Christianini, Cezário de Abreu, Bonifácio de Abreu, Rubens Caramez (then councilor of Cotia and who later became the first mayor of Itapevi), Raul Leonardo (the only emancipatory still alive), Jose dos Santos Novaes, Antônio Pedra Pereira and many others.

In the referendum held in 1958, about nine hundred people opted for emancipation, against only thirty unwilling to autonomy. That same year was formalized by Governor Jânio Quadros the law that created the city of Itapevi. The city was officially founded in the following year, on February 18, 1959, by Governor Carvalho Pinto. The first mayor was Rubens Caramez, who won the elections against Carlos de Castro.

Politics

The executive branch is currently exercised by the mayor Jaci Tadeu da Silva (PV) - elected in 2012 with a mandate until 2016, by Deputy Mayor Azevedo Fláudio Limes (PT) and the municipal secretaries appointed by the mayor (current Secretary of Government: Peter Tomishigue Mori).

List of mayors of Itapevi
 Rubens Caramez (1960-1964) vice: Romeu Manfrinatto
 Romeu Manfrinatto (1965-1968) vice: Pedro de Oliveira e Silva
 Osmar de Souza (1969-1972) vice: Dorival de Oliveira
 Romeu Manfrinatto (1973-1976) vice: Claro Camargo Ribeiro
 Jurandir Salvarani (1977-1982) vice: João Caramez
 Silas Manoel de Oliveira (1983-1988) vice: Elias de Souza
 Jurandir Salvarani (1989-1992) vice: Ramiro Eleutério Novaes
 João Caramez (1993-1996) vice: Lázaro Toledo Queiroz Filho
 Sérgio Montanheiro (1997-2000) vice: José Francisco de Oliveira
 Dalvani Anália Nasi Caramez (2001-2004) vice: Lineu Alberto Góis
 Maria Ruth Banholzer (2005-2008) vice: Jaci Tadeu da Silva
 Maria Ruth Banholzer (2009-2012) vice: Jaci Tadeu da Silva
 Jaci Tadeu da Silva (2013-2016) vice: Fláudio Azevedo Limas
 Igor Soares Ebert (2017 - 2020) vice: Marcos Teco Godoy
 Igor Soares Ebert (2021-2024) vice: Marcos Teco Godoy

Subdivisions 

 Some neighborhoods of Itapevi: 
 Alto da Colina
 Amador Bueno
 Ambuitá
 Bairro dos Abreus
 Centro
 Chácaras Monte Serrat
 hácara Santa Cecília
 Cruz Grande
 Condomínio Nova São Paulo
 Condomínio Vila Verde (antigo Transurb) 
 Condomínio Refúgio dos Pinheiros
 Granja Carolina
 Itaquí
 Jardim Briquet
 Jardim Bela Vista Alta
 Jardim Bela Vista Baixa
 Jardim Cruzeiro
 Jardim Dona Elvira
 Jardim Hokkaido
 Jardim Itaparica
 Jardim Julieta
 Jardim Maristela
 Jardim Paulista
 Jardim Portela
 Jardim Rainha
 Jardim Rute
 Jardim Rosemary
 Jardim Santa Rita
 Jardim São Carlos
 Jardim São Luiz
 Jardim Vitápolis
 Parque Boa Esperança
 Parque Santo Antônio
 Parque Suburbano
 Parque Wey
 Residencial das Flores
 Quatro Encruzilhadas
 Vila Aparecida
 Vila Aurora
 Vila Belmira
 Vila Dr. Cardoso
 Vila Esperança
 Vila Gióia
 Vila Nova Itapevi
 Vila Santa Rita
 Vila São Francisco

Geography

Physical setting
Itapevi is located in Southeastern Brazil, in southeastern São Paulo State, approximately halfway between São Paulo city and Sorocaba. The city is located on a plateau located within the Serra do Mar (Portuguese for "Sea Range"), itself a component of the vast region known as the Brazilian Highlands, with an average elevation of around 799 metres (2,621 ft) above sea level, although being at a distance of only about 100 kilometres from the Atlantic Ocean.

The original flora consisted mainly of a great variety of broadleaf evergreens. Today, non-native species are common, as the mild climate and abundant rainfall permit a multitude of tropical, subtropical and temperate plants to be cultivated, with eucalyptus being especially ubiquitous.

Climate
Itapevi climate is subtropical, temperate, warm the coldest month being July and warmest in February. Rainfall is abundant, amounting to an annual average of 1,324 mm. According to Köppen, Itapevi can be classified as a humid subtropical climate "Cfa".

The climate table below shows the monthly and annual mean temperatures and rainfall for the city of Itapevi:

Economy

The municipality of Itapevi concentrates almost all its population in urban areas, and therefore a reduced agricultural activity.

The Exame magazine pointed Itapevi among the 10 cities with the best economic development in the country, and as the first in the state of São Paulo. The ranking is part of the story "The best cities for business'.

Itapevi has a well diversified industrial park, with emphasis on the pharmaceutical industry. Large companies are located within the municipality, such as Henkel, Jaraguá, Cacau Show, Casa Suíça, Eurofarma, Alpla, Wyeth, Blanver, Bomi Brasil and others.

Between 1960 and 1980, one of the main industries was the Santa Rita Cement Factory, which belonged to the Grupo Votorantim and was deactivated and demolished.

Demography

Total: 200.874 inhabitants (2010).
Demographic density (inhabitants/km2): 2.430,15
Child mortality until 1 year (in 1000): 9,74 (2004)
HDI : 0,759 (2000)
 HDI-M Income: 0,663
 HDI-M Longevity: 0,737
 HDI-M Education: 0,876
(Source: IPEA data)
Changing demographics of the city of Itapevi

Source: IBAM and IBGE

References

External links

  Official City Website
  Itapevi Railway Station

Municipalities in São Paulo (state)